Hagerstown Commercial Core Historic District is a national historic district at Hagerstown, Washington County, Maryland, United States. The district consists approximately of a one and a half by two block rectangle which includes the major retail center of town. The center of the district is the public square and it is made up almost entirely of commercial buildings constructed or remodeled for retail purposes during the last 20 years of the 19th century and the first 20 years of the 20th century.  Also in the district are the Washington County Courthouse and the City Hall.

It was added to the National Register of Historic Places in 1983.

References

External links
, including photo from 1982, at Maryland Historical Trust
Boundary Map of the Hagerstown Commercial Core Historic District, Washington County, at Maryland Historical Trust

Historic districts in Washington County, Maryland
Hagerstown, Maryland
Historic districts on the National Register of Historic Places in Maryland
Beaux-Arts architecture in Maryland
Italianate architecture in Maryland
National Register of Historic Places in Washington County, Maryland